Air Vice-Marshal Roshan Biyanwila VSV, USP, ndc, psc (also known as RS Biyanwila) is a senior Air officer of the Sri Lanka Air Force who is serving as deputy Chief of Staff of the Sri Lanka Air Force. Before that, he was Director Administration at Air Force Headquarters from 2020 to 2022.

Early life and education 
Biyanwila was educated at St. Peter's College Colombo. Thereafter he joined the Sri Lanka Air Force as an Officer Cadet in the Administration Branch as an Officer Cadet in 19th inake course. He holds a Master of Business Administration from the University of Bedfordshire, United Kingdom.

Air Force career 
Roshan Biyanwila served as Secretary of Sri Lanka Cricket Board while he was Air Commodore. He took over the responsibility of Secretary, Sri Lanka Cricket board on January, 2018. He was Media Spokesperson representing Air force at Media Centre for National Security (MCNS) while he was Group Captain. After promoted to Air Vice Marshal he became Director of Admin. He officially took over the deputy chief of staff, SLAF appointment on 1 January 2023.

Personal life 
Biyanwila is married to Dilini and they have a daughter and son.

References 

Living people
Sri Lanka Air Force air vice-marshals
1968 births
Sri Lanka Air Force Academy graduates
Alumni of the University of Bedfordshire
Alumni of St. Peter's College, Colombo